San Francisco County Jails are operated by the Sheriff's Department Custody Division of the City and County of San Francisco. The system comprises eight jails, with approximately 55,000 annual bookings administered by 800 deputy sheriffs.

Facilities
Two of these jails are located in the Hall of Justice on Bryant Street. One of the jails is located in ward 7D/7L in San Francisco General Hospital. Two jails are located at the San Bruno Complex Program Facility, located ten miles south of San Francisco.

The newest San Francisco jail complex is located near the Hall of Justice on Seventh Street. Opened in 1994, the complex is actually two jails. This main complex jail is a "direct supervision facility [that] has become a national model for program-oriented prisoner rehabilitation." The second, which acts as the main intake and release facility for the city, was praised by Pulitzer Prize-winning architecture critic Allan Temko as "a stunning victory for architectural freedom over bureaucratic stupidity."

The first jail established in San Francisco was demanded by the Alcalde, later first mayor, John W. Geary and set up in a beached brig, the Ephemia on the shore of Yerba Buena Cove.  Later there was a jail on Broadway and jails within the two halls of justice on the east side of Portsmouth Square. The fourth floor of the post-earthquake Hall of Justice on Kearny Street served as a jail until 1961, when the present Hall of Justice at 850 Bryant Street opened.

The Ingleside Jail opened in 1872 on the present site of the City College of San Francisco. It served as the largest jail in the city. When the former County Jail 3 opened in San Bruno in 1934, the Ingleside Jail was demolished and the construction of City College commenced. The former County Jail #3 closed in 2006, after over 70 years of service, replaced by the modern direct-supervision facility, County Jail 5. The 1934 San Bruno jail was demolished in 2012.

Most San Francisco county jail inmates, like 60% of the U.S. jail population and 70% of inmates in California jails, have not been convicted of any crime. They are there awaiting trial, often for months, usually because they cannot afford bail.

Intake & Release
 County Jail 1 (425 7th Street)

Classification
 County Jail 2 (425 7th Street)

Housing
 County Jail 2 (425 7th Street)
 County Jail 3 (Hall of Justice, 850 Bryant Street, 6th Floor)
 County Jail 4 (Hall of Justice, 850 Bryant Street, 7th Floor)
 County Jail 5 (1 Moreland Drive, San Bruno)  (New state-of-the-art facility opened in 2006)
 County Jail 6 (1 Moreland Drive, San Bruno)
 County Jail 7 (Ward 7D/7L of San Francisco General Hospital)

Resolve to Stop Violence Project 

Violent inmates who are willing to change may participate in the Resolve to Stop Violence Project (RSVP), a partnership with Community Works West that aims to reduce community violence and recidivism.

References

External links

 Jails — San Francisco Sheriff's Department official website
 Chronological List of San Francisco County Jails 1846-present — San Francisco Sheriff's Department history website
 SF Sheriff's Dept history by former Sheriff Michael Hennessy and Richard Dyer

Jails in California
Government buildings in San Francisco
San Francisco-related lists